Rovira is a surname of Catalan origin. Variants of Rovira include Rovires, Robira, Ruvira, Rubira, Rubires, Roïra and Ruyra, as well as the compound forms Roviralta, Roviro, Rovireta, Rovirola and Rubirosa.

List of persons with the surname

Gaspar de Portolá i Rovira (1716-1786), Spanish Catalan noble, soldier, explorer
Antoni Rovira i Virgili (1882–1949), Spanish Catalan politician
Antoni Rovira i Trias (1816–1889), Spanish Catalan architect
Carlos Rovira (born 1956), Argentine politician
Custodio García Rovira (1780–1816), Neogranadine general and statesman
Francesc Rovira i Sala (1764–1820), priest and partisan leader of the Peninsular War 
Francisco Rovira Beleta (1913–1999), Spanish Catalan screenwriter and film director
Jacme Rovira, medieval Catalan poet
Josep Rovira Soler (1900–1998), Spanish Catalan painter
Josep-Lluís Carod-Rovira (born 1952), Spanish Catalan politician
José Miguel Rovira (c. 1920–1993), Puerto Rican industrialist
Luis Dario Rovira (1923–2011), justice of the Colorado Supreme Court
Pere de Rovira (1143–1158), Catalonia, Spain, Knights Templar (First Provincial Master)

Others
Rovira Biscuits Corporation, the crackers company

References

Catalan-language surnames